Andrea Parola (born 22 April 1979) is a retired Italian football midfielder.

Football career
He started his career at native club Pisa Calcio at Serie C2. He was loaned to Serie D side Poggibonsi in summer 1999, and then to Bulgarian A PFG team Naftex Burgas in summer 2000. He returned to Pisa in summer 2001, this time at Serie C1, before loaned out again at Grosseto of Serie C2.

He was signed by Triestina of Serie B in summer 2003 in co-ownership deal, and Triestina took over the full ownership a year later.

On 24 August 2005, he was spotted by newly promoted team Ascoli, and made his Serie A debut four days later, against A.C. Milan on 28 August. After impressing performances in first half of the 2005–06 season, Udinese Calcio bought half of Parola's right in January 2006, and kept Parola on loan at Acsoli.

But at the end of season, Ascoli bought back half of the right and sold all the rights to Sampdoria. His teammate Fabio Quagliarella also sold from Udinese. He joined Cagliari next season, on a three-year contract.

He was released by Cagliari on 1 July 2010 and signed a six months contract with Serie B side Novara on 3 January 2011, the first working day of Lega Serie B.

References

1979 births
Living people
Italian footballers
Association football midfielders
Italian expatriate footballers
Pisa S.C. players
Neftochimic Burgas players
U.S. Triestina Calcio 1918 players
Ascoli Calcio 1898 F.C. players
U.C. Sampdoria players
Cagliari Calcio players
Piacenza Calcio 1919 players
A.S.G. Nocerina players
A.C. Reggiana 1919 players
First Professional Football League (Bulgaria) players
Serie A players
Serie B players
Serie C players
Expatriate footballers in Bulgaria
Sportspeople from Pisa
Footballers from Tuscany